Persson (also Person, Pärsson) is the eighth most common Swedish family name. It is a patronymic surname and literally means "son of Per".

People with the surname
Åke Persson, Swedish jazz trombonist
Erling Persson, founder of Swedish clothing company H&M
Essy Persson, Swedish actress
Göran Persson, Swedish politician and former Prime Minister (1996-2006)
Håkan Persson, Swedish 3D-Artist 
Joakim Persson, retired Swedish footballer
Johanna Persson, Swedish female badminton player
Jöran Persson, counsellor to King Erik XIV of Sweden
Jörgen Persson, Swedish table tennis player
Karl-Johan Persson, billionaire CEO and president of Swedish company H&M
Kristin Persson, Swedish physicist and chemist
Kristina Persson (born 1945), Swedish politician
Leif G. W. Persson, Swedish criminologist and writer
Marie Persson (born 1967), Swedish curler
Markus Persson, Swedish video game developer
Miah Persson, Swedish soprano
Michael Persson (born 1959), Swedish weightlifter
Nahid Persson, Swedish director
Nina Persson, Swedish pop singer
Örjan Persson, retired Swedish footballer
Peter Persson (born 1955), Swedish politician
Rickard Persson (born 1959), Swedish politician
Sara Persson, Swedish female badminton player
Set Persson, Swedish communist politician
Stefan Persson (fashion magnate), billionaire owner of Swedish company H&M
Stefan Persson (ice hockey), retired professional ice hockey player
Stieg Persson, Australian artist
Tom Persson, billionaire hier to H&M fortune and filmmaker
Torsten Persson, Swedish economist
Ulrica Persson, Swedish cross-country skier

Fictional characters
Una Persson, a recurring character in many of Michael Moorcock's 'Multiverse' novels.

Other variations
Magnus Pehrsson, retired Swedish footballer
Robert Pehrsson, Swedish musician
Cristina Husmark Pehrsson, Swedish politician
Axel Pehrsson-Bramstorp, former Prime Minister of Sweden
Anja Pärson (born 1981), Swedish Olympic skier

References

See also 
Persson Motorsport, German racing team competing in the Deutsche Tourenwagen Masters
Peerson
Pehrson
Person (surname)

Swedish-language surnames
Patronymic surnames
Surnames from given names